The 2013 Scheldeprijs was the 101st edition of the Scheldeprijs cycle race and was held on 3 April 2013. The race was won by Marcel Kittel of the Argos–Shimano team.

General classification

References

2013
2013 in road cycling
2013 in Belgian sport